Catagela adoceta is a moth in the family Crambidae. It was described by Ian Francis Bell Common in 1960. It is found in Australia, where it has been recorded from Queensland.

References

Moths described in 1960
Schoenobiinae